Weribold von Heys (died 1477) was a Roman Catholic prelate who served as Auxiliary Bishop of Münster (1470–1477).

Biography
Weribold von Heys was ordained a priest in the Order of Friars Minor. On 10 December 1470, he was appointed during the papacy of Pope Paul II as Auxiliary Bishop of Münster and Titular Bishop of Larissa in Syria. On 1 January 1471, he was consecrated bishop by Giacomo, Bishop of Sant'Angelo dei Lombardi, with Antonio Cicco da Pontecorvo, Bishop of Caserta, with Antonio de Bonaumbra, Bishop of Accia, serving as co-consecrators. He served as Auxiliary Bishop of Münster until his death in 1477.

References 

1477 deaths
15th-century German Roman Catholic bishops
Bishops appointed by Pope Paul II